The following lists events that happened during 2000 in Mexico.

Incumbents

Federal government

President
 President
Ernesto Zedillo , until November 30
 Vicente Fox, starting December 1 Fox was the first president not affiliated with PRI since 1929.

Cabinet

 Interior Secretary (SEGOB)
Diódoro Carrasco Altamirano, until November 30
Santiago Creel, starting December 1
 Secretary of Foreign Affairs (SRE)
Rosario Green, until November 30
Jorge Castañeda Gutman, starting December 1 
 Communications Secretary (SCT)
Carlos Ruiz Sacristán, until November 30
Pedro Cerisola, starting December 1 
 Education Secretary (SEP)
Miguel Limón Rojas, until November 30
Reyes Tamez, starting December 1 
 Secretary of Defense (SEDENA)
Enrique Cervantes Aguirre, until November 30
Gerardo Clemente Vega, starting December 1
 Secretary of Navy (SEMAR)
José Ramón Lorenzo Franco, until November 30
Marco Antonio Peyrot González, starting December 1 
 Secretary of Labor and Social Welfare (STPS)
Mariano Palacios Alcocer, until November 30
José Carlos María Abascal Carranza, starting December 1
 Secretary of Social Development (SEDESOL)
Carlos Jarque, until November 30
Josefina Vázquez Mota, starting December 1
 Tourism Secretary (SECTUR)
Óscar Espinosa Villarreal, until November 30
Leticia Navarro, starting December 1
Secretary of the Environment
(SEMARNAP): Julia Carabias Lillo (until November 30)
 (SEMARNAT): Víctor Lichtinger (starting December 1)
 Secretary of Health (SALUD)
José Antonio González Fernández, until November 30
Julio Frenk, starting December 1
Attorney General of Mexico (PRG)
Jorge Madrazo Cuéllar, until November 30
Rafael Macedo de la Concha, starting December 1

Supreme Court 

 President of the Supreme Court: Genaro David Góngora Pimentel

Governors 

 Aguascalientes: Felipe González González 
 Baja California: Alejandro González Alcocer 
Baja California Sur: Leonel Cota Montaño  
 Campeche: José Antonio González Curi 
 Chiapas
Roberto Albores Guillén
Pablo Salazar Mendiguchía , starting December 8 
 Chihuahua: Patricio Martínez García 
 Coahuila: Enrique Martínez y Martínez 
 Colima: Fernando Moreno Peña 
 Durango: Ángel Sergio Guerrero Mier 
 Guanajuato
Ramón Martín Huerta (substitute) , until September 25
Juan Carlos Romero Hicks , starting September 25
 Guerrero: René Juárez Cisneros 
 Hidalgo: Manuel Ángel Núñez Soto 
 Jalisco: Alberto Cárdenas 
 State of Mexico: Arturo Montiel 
 Michoacán: Víctor Manuel Tinoco Rubí  
 Morelos
Jorge Morales Barud (Substitute) , until May 18.
Jorge Arturo García Rubí (Interim) , May 18 to September 30.
Sergio Estrada Cajigal Ramírez , starting October 1.
 Nayarit: Antonio Echevarría Domínguez
 Nuevo León: Fernando Canales Clariond 
 Oaxaca: José Murat Casab 
 Puebla: Melquíades Morales 
 Querétaro: Ignacio Loyola Vera 
 Quintana Roo: Joaquín Hendricks Díaz 
 San Luis Potosí: Fernando Silva Nieto
 Sinaloa: Juan S. Millán 
 Sonora: Armando López Nogales
 Tabasco: Roberto Madrazo , until December 31
 Tamaulipas: Tomás Yarrington 	
 Tlaxcala: Alfonso Sánchez Anaya 
 Veracruz: Miguel Alemán Velasco 
 Yucatán: Víctor Cervera Pacheco 
 Zacatecas: Ricardo Monreal 
Head of Government of the Federal District
Rosario Robles , until December 4
Andrés Manuel López Obrador , starting December 5

Events 
 The National Autonomous University of Mexico, which is closed since April 1999, becomes the scene of a mass rally to protest against rising tuition fees and to require student participation in the restructuring of Latin America's main university.
 February 23: Musician Carlos Santana receives 8 Grammy Awards, achieving the same record that Michael Jackson, established in 1983. 
April 15: Pope John Paul II names Eduardo Patino and Hipolito Reyes Larios as bishops of the newly created dioceses of Córdoba and Orizaba in the state of Veracruz.
 July 2: 2000 Mexican general election.
 December: Tens of thousands of people were evacuated from the area near Popocateptl by the government, based on the warnings of scientists. The volcano then made its largest display in 1,200 years.

Awards	

	
Belisario Domínguez Medal of Honor	– Leopoldo Zea Aguilar
Order of the Aztec Eagle	
National Prize for Arts and Sciences	
National Public Administration Prize	
Ohtli Award
 Amanda Aguirre
 Columba Bush
 Kika de la Garza
 Juliet V. Garcia
 Filemon Vela Sr.

Popular culture

Notable births

Notable deaths
May 9 — Carmen Romano de Lopez, First Lady of Mexico (1976-1982) (b. 1926)
September 9 – Carlos Castillo Peraza. Politician and journalist.
September 17 – Alejandro Cervantes Delgado, politician and economist, governor of Guerrero 1981-1987; heart attack (b. 1926)
December 31 – Alfonso Corona del Rosal, politician (PRI), Regent of the Federal District; bronchitis and pneumonia

References

Bibliography

 
Years of the 20th century in Mexico
Mexico
2000s in Mexico
Mexico